Aspergillus heterothallicus is a species of fungus in the genus Aspergillus. It is from the Usti section. The species was first described in 1965. It has been reported to produce emethallicins, emeheterone, emesterones A & B, 5’-hydroxyaveranthin, stellatin, and sterigmatocystin.

Growth and morphology

A. heterothallicus has been cultivated on both Czapek yeast extract agar (CYA) plates and Malt Extract Agar Oxoid® (MEAOX) plates. The growth morphology of the colonies can be seen in the pictures below.

References 

heterothallicus
Fungi described in 1965